Simeon was the second of the six sons of Jacob and Leah (Jacob’s second son), and the founder of the Israelite Tribe of Simeon, according to the Book of Genesis. However, some Biblical scholars view this as postdiction, an eponymous metaphor providing an etiology of the connectedness of the tribe to others in the Israelite confederation. With Leah as a matriarch, Biblical scholars regard the tribe as having been believed by the text's authors to have been part of the original Israelite confederation. However, the tribe is absent from the parts of the Bible which textual scholars regard as the oldest (for example, the ancient Song of Deborah). Some scholars think that Simeon was not originally regarded as a distinct tribe.

Simeon's name
The text of the Torah says that the name of Simeon refers to Leah's belief that God had heard that Jacob preferred her sister, Rachel, implying a derivation from the Hebrew term shama oni ( šāmaʿ ʾōnī) meaning "he has heard of my suffering"; this is a similar etymology as the Torah gives for the theophoric name Ishmael ("El has heard"), implying that the names are cognate. The name is sometimes interpreted as meaning "he who listens to the words of God", and at other times thought to derive from sham 'avon ( šām ʿāvōn), meaning "there is sin", which is argued to be a prophetic reference to Zimri's sexual miscegenation with a Midianite woman, a type of relationship which rabbinical sources regard as sinful.

Alternatively, Hitzig, W. R. Smith, Stade, and Kerber compared שִׁמְעוֹן Šīmə‘ōn to Arabic سِمع simˤ "the offspring of the hyena and the female wolf"; as supports, Smith points to Arabic tribal names Simˤ "a subdivision of the defenders (the Medinites)" and Samˤān "a subdivision of Tamim".

Simeon in Shechem

In the Torah's account of the rape of Dinah, wherein Dinah was raped (or in some versions, merely seduced) by a Canaanite named Shechem. Simeon and his brother Levi took violent revenge against the inhabitants of the city by tricking them into circumcising themselves and then killing them when they are weakened. The account dramatizes the theme of tension between marriage within a group (endogamy) and marriage with outsiders (exogamy).

Jacob castigates Simeon and Levi for this as their actions have placed the family in danger of a retaliatory strike by their neighbors. Later, in his final blessing, he condemns Simeon's descendants to become divided and scattered. Some Biblical scholars regard the account of the rape of Dinah as an aetiological myth, created by the Jahwist, to justify the presence of a sanctuary at Shechem; in comparison to the Elohist's justification of the Shechem sanctuary, where the land is simply purchased by Jacob, and dedicated to El Elohe Israel (meaning El is the God of Israel, mighty is the God of Israel, or God, the God of Israel). The Jahwist's account is viewed as a veiled slight against the sanctuary.

Simeon's vengeance, and punishment in the blessing, are viewed by biblical scholars as aetiological postdictions which were designed to explain why, in the time of the author of the blessing (900-700BC), the tribe of Simeon was dwindling out of existence. The midrashic book of Jasher, argues that it was Simeon who deceived Hamor by insisting that the men of Shechem would need to be circumcised. It goes on to argue that Simeon was extremely strong, despite only being 14 years old, and was able to slaughter all the men of Shechem nearly single-handedly, only having assistance from his brother Levi, and captured 100 young women, marrying the one named "Bonah".

Relation with Joseph
The classical rabbinical sources argue that Simeon was very fearless, but also was particularly envious, and so had always been antagonistic and spiteful towards Joseph, owing to Joseph being Jacob's favourite son. The midrashic book of Jasher argues that Simeon was the one who proposed that the brothers should kill Joseph, and other classical sources argue that it was Simeon who threw Joseph into a pit, and became furious when he found out that Judah had sold Joseph rather than killed him. According to the classical sources, Simeon suffered divine punishment for this inhumanity, with his right hand withered, but this caused Simeon to repent, and so his hand was restored a week later.

In the biblical Joseph narrative, when Joseph, having settled in Egypt, asks his brothers to bring Benjamin to him, he takes Simeon hostage to ensure that they return. According to classical rabbinical sources, Joseph chose Simeon to be the hostage because he was concerned that if Simeon was not separated from Levi, then Levi and Simeon might destroy Egypt together, since they had already destroyed Shechem. Another theory was that Joseph singled out Simeon due to his taking a prominent role in Joseph's betrayal, however Driscoll points out that there is no mention of this in the narrative. According to the midrashic book of Jasher, Simeon was not willing to become a hostage, so Joseph sent 70 strong Egyptians to take Simeon by force, but Simeon had a very powerful voice, and so was able to scare off the Egyptians simply by shouting. The text states that Simeon was eventually subdued by Manasseh, and imprisoned. The Testament of Simeon, on the other hand, declares that Simeon acknowledged that it was just for him to be imprisoned, given his earlier mistreatment of Joseph, and so he went willingly.

According to the Book of Jubilees, Simeon was born on 21 Tevet, and according to the book of Genesis he had six sons. Although some classical rabbinical sources argue that the mother of his children, and his wife, was Bonah, one of the women from Shechem, other classical rabbinical sources argue that Simeon's wife (and the mother of his children) was Dinah, his sister, who had insisted on the marriage before she would be willing to leave Shechem's home (Shechem was her rapist/lover). Many of the rabbinical sources argue that Simeon died at the age of 120, roughly three years before the death of his brother Reuben, although Numbers Rabbah states that Simeon became the senior of the brothers after Reuben had died.

Tomb 
A Samaritan tradition recorded in the late 19th century considered Neby Shem'on, a maqam near Kfar Saba, to be the burial place of Simeon.

Children
Jemuel
Jamin
Ohad
Jachin
Zohar (also called Zerah)
Shaul

See also 
 Tribe of Simeon
 Simeon in rabbinic literature

References

External links

Founders of biblical tribes
Children of Jacob
Book of Genesis people
Tribe of Simeon
Book of Jubilees